Patrizia von Brandenstein (born April 15, 1943) is an American production designer. She was the first woman to win an Academy Award for production design and has been nominated for two more in the category Best Art Direction. She has shown versatility in creating sets for both lavish historical films and glossy contemporary fare.

She was born in Arizona to German Russian emigrant parents. Her education abroad closed with two years as an apprentice at the famed Comédie Française. She started with the off-Broadway scene of 1960s New York at the Actors Studio and La MaMa as a seamstress, prop maker and scene painter. 1966 saw the real start of her career in design with an eight-year stay creating costumes and sets at the American Conservatory Theater in San Francisco under William Ball. She also met future husband and fellow production designer Stuart Wurtzel. She has designed movies in a wide range of subjects, styles, and periods: from the low-budget, break-dancing musical Beat Street to the expensive plutonium-plant melodrama Silkwood.

Director Neil Burger, in his DVD commentary for Limitless, singles out von Brandenstein for her excellent work on the film.

Selected filmography
Brandenstein has won an Academy Award for Best Art Direction and has been nominated for two more:
Won
 Amadeus (1984)
Nominated
 Ragtime (1981)
 The Untouchables (1987)

References

External links
 
 

1943 births
Living people
American people of German-Russian descent
American production designers
Best Art Direction Academy Award winners
Artists from Arizona
Women production designers